The Ulster Senior Club Football Championship is an annual Gaelic football competition played between the top clubs in Ulster GAA. The trophy awarded to the winners is the Seamus McFerran Cup. The winners and the Connacht, Leinster, Munster and London champions compete in the All-Ireland Senior Club Football Championship.

Glen are the current champions, having beaten Kilcoo in the 2022 final. Crossmaglen Rangers from Armagh have won the most titles with eleven wins.

Competition format
Each of the nine counties of Ulster organise a county championship annually for their top clubs. The nine county champions compete in the Ulster Senior Club Football Championship in a knock-out format.

Finals listed by year

Wins listed by club

Wins listed by county

No club from Fermanagh or Cavan has ever won the Ulster Senior Club Football Championship.

See also
 Ulster Senior Club Football League
 Ulster Senior Club Hurling Championship

References

 
1